Casazza is a surname. Notable people with the surname include:

Elvira Casazza (1887–1965), Italian mezzo-soprano opera singer
Fabrizio Casazza (born 1970), Italian footballer
Giulio Gatti-Casazza (1869–1940), Italian opera manager
Peter G. Casazza (born 1945), American mathematician